Matthew Lewis Gibson (born 2 September 1996) is a British professional racing cyclist, who currently rides for UCI ProTeam .

A former member of the British Cycling Olympic Academy Programme, Gibson specialises in endurance and timed events and came 5th and 10th in the Junior Time Trial at the 2013 and 2014 UCI Road World Championships, respectively. Gibson was selected to represent Great Britain at the 2015 UCI Track Cycling World Championships and, at 18 years old, he was the youngest rider on the squad.

Major results

2013
 National Junior Track Championships
1st  Individual pursuit
1st  Kilo
 5th Time trial, UCI Junior Road World Championships
 10th Overall Trofeo Karlsberg
2014
 1st  Individual pursuit, National Junior Track Championships
 1st Round 3 – Peterborough Tour Series
 1st Six Days of Ghent Future Stars (with Chris Lawless)
 3rd Overall Junior Tour of Wales
 6th Overall Course de la Paix Juniors
1st Stage 2a (ITT)
 10th Time trial, UCI Junior Road World Championships
2015
 1st  Team pursuit, UEC European Track Championships
 UEC European Under-23 Track Championships
1st  Scratch race
1st  Team pursuit
 3rd  Team pursuit, 2014–15 UCI Track Cycling World Cup, Cali
 3rd Road race, National Under-23 Road Championships
2017
 2nd Overall Bay Classic Series
2018
 1st  National Criterium Championships
 1st Stage 3 New Zealand Cycle Classic
 1st Stage 5 Tour de l'Avenir
 1st Stage 5 Tour du Loir-et-Cher
 Tour Series
1st  Points classification
1st Round 2 – Motherwell
 3rd GP Izola
 10th Overall Tour de Normandie
1st  Points classification
1st Stage 6
2019
 1st Stage 13 Tour of Qinghai Lake
 6th Overall Tour of China I
2022
 1st Stage 1b Olympia's Tour

References

External links
 
 Matthew Gibson profile at British Cycling
 Matthew Gibson profile at SportsAid

1996 births
Living people
British male cyclists
Sportspeople from Warrington